Omer may refer to:

 Omer (unit), an ancient unit of measure used in the era of the ancient Temple in Jerusalem
 The Counting of the Omer (sefirat ha'omer), a 49 day period in the Jewish calendar
 Omer (Book of Mormon), a Jaredite king

People
 A variant spelling of the given name Omar (includes a list of Omers) 
 Mordechai Omer (1940–2011), Israeli art historian and museum administrator

Places
 Omer, Israel, a town near Beersheba
 Omer, Michigan, United States, the smallest city in Michigan

Other uses
Omer (submarine), the fastest human-powered submarine at the International Submarine Races

See also 
 Saint Omer (disambiguation)
OMERS (Ontario Municipal Employees Pension Scheme)
 Omar (disambiguation)